Mohammadhossein Eslami (born April 13, 2001) is an Iranian football midfielder who currently plays for Zob Ahan in the Persian Gulf Pro League.

Club career

Zob Ahan
He made his debut for Zob Ahan in 10th fixtures of 2021–22 Persian Gulf Pro League against Havadar while he substituted in for Hossein Ebrahimi.

References

Living people
2001 births
Association football midfielders
Iranian footballers
Zob Ahan Esfahan F.C. players
Persian Gulf Pro League players